The third series of the British children's television series The Dumping Ground began broadcasting on 16 January 2015 on CBBC and ended on 8 December 2015. The series follows the lives of the children living in the fictional children's care home of Ashdene Ridge, nicknamed by them "The Dumping Ground". It consists of twenty, thirty-minute episodes, airing in two halves in January and October 2015. It is the eleventh series in The Story of Tracy Beaker franchise.

Cast

All of the cast from the show's second series returned, with the exceptions of Daniel Pearson, who played Rick Barber, left in the series 2 finale. Leanne Dunstan, who played Faith Davis, also left the series, but returned for respite care. Chris Slater reprised his role as Frank Matthews in episode 20 "Refuge" for a guest appearance.

Main

Guest

Casting
Casting calls confirmed that there would feature 7 new characters, including; twins Toni and Billie, played by Nelly and Gwen Currant; dog Mischief, which CBBC ran a competition for viewers to name it and is played by Sage; a disabled character called Finn, as well as Sasha, Dexter and Ryan, played by Ruben Reuter, Annabelle Davis, Alexander Aze and Lewis Hamilton respectively. This series also saw the final appearance of Joe Maw as Johnny Taylor in the part 1 finale "Dragon Slayer".

Episodes

Production
This series featured scripts from Emma Reeves, Richard Lazarus and Sophie Petzal, among others. Philip Gladwin has been confirmed as the show's new script editor.

Philip Leach took over from Simon Nelson as producer and Lis Steele continued her position as executive producer. Roberto Bangura, who was worked on shows such as Waterloo Road has joined the directing team. Other directors that directed the series include; Nigel Douglas, who previously worked on The Dumping Ground; and former Wolfblood director, Matthew Evans.

Production began on 16 June 2014, and was completed on 10 November 2014.

References

2015 British television seasons
The Dumping Ground